This is a list of tribute albums of the American R&B band, Earth, Wind & Fire.

Notes

Earth, Wind and Fire